Calliscia callisceles is a species of fly in the family Sciomyzidae from the Neotropical region, and the only described species in the genus Calliscia.

References

Sciomyzidae
Insects described in 1963
Diptera of South America